Negro Run is a stream in Wood County, West Virginia, in the United States.

History
According to one account, Negro Run was so named when a black woman gave birth while camped along its banks.

See also
List of rivers of West Virginia

References

Rivers of Wood County, West Virginia
Rivers of West Virginia